Lin-7 homolog B is a protein that in humans is encoded by the LIN7B gene.

Interactions 

LIN7B has been shown to interact with:
 ACCN3,
 GRIN2B,
 KCNJ12  and
 KCNJ4.

References

Further reading